Discus (sometimes stylized as DISCUS, also referred to as South Carolina's Virtual Library and SC Discus) is a free-of-charge digital library intended exclusively for residents of the U.S. state of South Carolina that is managed by the South Carolina State Library. The digital library aims to provide several reliable online resources. Discus is mainly intended for use in school and state libraries, but requires a login to be accessed elsewhere.

References

American digital libraries
2001 establishments in South Carolina